The Honda MH01 is an experimental business jet developed by the Japanese company Honda, in cooperation with the Raspet Flight Research Laboratory of Mississippi State University.

Using the airframe of a Beechcraft Bonanza, Honda sought to incorporate composite materials into a metal aircraft, the first this had been done in a business aircraft. The goal was also to gain experience in aircraft design and construction. Although at the time there was a twin engine with the engines above the wings (the VFW-Fokker 614), this arrangement used in the MH01 was unusual. The wings are slightly anhedral and the two engines are above them.

The prototype is currently in a museum in Japan.

Its successor is the Honda MH02, a jet that uses the same configuration and uses exclusively composite materials.

See also

Notes

MH02
1980s Japanese experimental aircraft
Mississippi State University aircraft
1980s United States experimental aircraft
Single-engined tractor aircraft